The following outline is provided as an overview of and topical guide to George R. R. Martin's A Song of Ice and Fire media franchise:

A Song of Ice and Fire – series of epic fantasy novels by the American novelist and screenwriter George R. R. Martin. A Song of Ice and Fire takes place on the fictional continents Westeros and Essos. The point of view of each chapter in the story is a limited perspective of a range of characters growing from nine, in the first novel, to thirty-one by the fifth. The works and their setting have inspired a large media franchise. Among the many derived works are several prequel novellas, a TV series, a comic book adaptation, and several card, board, and video games.

What type of thing is A Song of Ice and Fire? 

A Song of Ice and Fire is an example of all of the following:

 Fiction – form of narrative which deals, in part or in whole, with events that are not factual, but rather, imaginary and invented by its author(s). Although fiction often describes a major branch of literary work, it is also applied to theatrical, cinematic, and musical work.
 A series of novels – set or series of novels which share common themes, characters, or settings, but where each novel has its own title and free-standing storyline, and can thus be read independently or out of sequence. Novels are a form of fiction.
 Fantasy fiction – fiction genre that uses magic or other supernatural elements as a main plot element, theme, or setting.
 High fantasy fiction – subgenre of fantasy, defined either by its setting in an imaginary world or by the epic stature of its characters, themes, and plot.
 a fantasy world –  fictional setting comprising an entire planet, used in fantasy fiction, for example in novels and games. Typical worlds involve magic or magical abilities and often, but not always, either a medieval or futuristic theme. Some worlds may be an entirely independent world set in another universe. See World of A Song of Ice and Fire.
 a fictional setting – place that exists only in fiction and not in reality. Writers may create and describe such places to serve as the backdrop for their fictional works.
 a fictional universe –
 a constructed world – Developing an imaginary setting with coherent qualities such as a history, geography, and ecology is a key task for many science fiction and fantasy writers. Worldbuilding often involves the creation of maps, a backstory, and people for the world. Constructed worlds can enrich the backstory and history of fictional works, and can be created for personal amusement or for specific creative endeavors such as novels, video games, or role-playing games.
 Intellectual property – creations of the mind, protected by copyright.  Intangible assets, such as musical, literary, and artistic works. The first volume of the series, A Game of Thrones, was published (and copyrighted) in 1996.
 a media franchise –  collection of media whereby intellectual property (IP) is licensed from an original work of media (usually a work of fiction), such as a film, a work of literature, a television program or a video game, to other parties or partners for commercial exploitation. A property can be exploited across a range of mediums and by a variety of industries for merchandising purposes. A Song of Ice and Fire has been marketed in the form of books, a television series, a comic book, games, etc. See franchises originating in literary works.

A Song of Ice and Fire media franchise

Original works 
 Author: George R. R. Martin
 Novels
 A Game of Thrones (1996)
 A Clash of Kings (1998)
 A Storm of Swords (2000)
 A Feast for Crows (2005)
 A Dance with Dragons (2011)
 The Winds of Winter (TBA)
 A Dream of Spring (TBA)
 Prequels
 Tales of Dunk and Egg (1998–2015) / A Knight of the Seven Kingdoms (2015)
 The Hedge Knight (1998)
 The Sworn Sword (2003)
 The Mystery Knight (2010)
 The Princess and the Queen (2013)
 The Rogue Prince (2014)
 The Sons of the Dragon (2017)
 Fire & Blood (2018)

Works based on A Song of Ice and Fire 

 Companion books
 The World of Ice & Fire (2014)

Game of Thrones television series 

 Game of Thrones episodes
 Game of Thrones Season 1
 "Winter Is Coming"
 "The Kingsroad"
 "Lord Snow"
 "Cripples, Bastards, and Broken Things"
 "The Wolf and the Lion"
 "A Golden Crown"
 "You Win or You Die"
 "The Pointy End"
 "Baelor"
 "Fire and Blood"
 Game of Thrones Season 2
 "The North Remembers"
 "The Night Lands"
 "What Is Dead May Never Die"
 "Garden of Bones"
 "The Ghost of Harrenhal"
 "The Old Gods and the New"
 "A Man Without Honor"
 "The Prince of Winterfell"
 "Blackwater"
 "Valar Morghulis"
 Game of Thrones Season 3
 "Valar Dohaeris"
 "Dark Wings, Dark Words"
 "Walk of Punishment"
 "And Now His Watch Is Ended"
 "Kissed by Fire"
 "The Climb"
 "The Bear and the Maiden Fair"
 "Second Sons"
 "The Rains of Castamere"
 "Mhysa"
 Game of Thrones Season 4
 "Two Swords"
 "The Lion and the Rose"
 "Breaker of Chains"
 "Oathkeeper"
 "First of His Name"
 "The Laws of Gods and Men"
 "Mockingbird"
 "The Mountain and the Viper"
 "The Watchers on the Wall"
 "The Children"
 Game of Thrones Season 5
 "The Wars to Come"
 "The House of Black and White"
 "High Sparrow"
 "Sons of the Harpy"
 "Kill the Boy"
 "Unbowed, Unbent, Unbroken"
 "The Gift"
 "Hardhome"
 "The Dance of Dragons"
 "Mother's Mercy"
 Game of Thrones Season 6
 "The Red Woman"
 "Home"
 "Oathbreaker"
 "Book of the Stranger"
 "The Door"
 "Blood of My Blood"
 "The Broken Man"
 "No One"
 "Battle of the Bastards"
 "The Winds of Winter"
 Game of Thrones Season 7
 "Dragonstone"
 "Stormborn"
 "The Queen's Justice"
 "The Spoils of War"
 "Eastwatch"
 "Beyond the Wall"
 "The Dragon and the Wolf"
 Game of Thrones Season 8
 "Winterfell"
 "A Knight of the Seven Kingdoms"
 "The Long Night"
 "The Last of the Starks"
 "The Bells"
 "The Iron Throne"
 Companion series
 After the Thrones
 Thronecast
 Awards and nominations received by Game of Thrones
 Game of Thrones characters
 Game of Thrones directors
 Music of Game of Thrones
 Game of Thrones title sequence

Tabletop games 
 Board game
First expansion
 Second expansion
Second Edition
First expansion
Second Expansion
Third Expansion
 Card game
 Second edition

A Song of Ice and Fire video games 
 A Song of Ice and Fire video games
 A Game of Thrones: Genesis
 Game of Thrones (2012)
 Game of Thrones: Ascent
 Game of Thrones (2014)
 Game of Thrones: Conquest
 Reigns: Game of Thrones
 Game of Thrones: Seven Kingdoms

A Song of Ice and Fire role-playing games 
 A Game of Thrones
 A Song of Ice and Fire Roleplaying

Other media 
 Comic book series
 Second series

World of A Song of Ice and Fire

Geography of The Known World

Westeros 

 Regions of Westeros
 The Crownlands
 Dorne
 The Iron Islands
 The North
 Beyond the Wall
 The Reach
 The Riverlands
 The Stormlands
 The Vale of Arryn
 The Westerlands

 Strongholds of Westeros
 Casterly Rock
 Harrenhal
 Highgarden
 King's Landing
 Old Town
 Pyke
 Riverrun
 Storm's End
 Sunspear
 The Eyrie
 The Twins
 The Wall
 Winterfell

Essos

People in The Known World 

 Game of Thrones characters
 A Song of Ice and Fire characters
 Petyr Baelish
 Joffrey Baratheon
 Renly Baratheon
 Robert Baratheon
 Stannis Baratheon
 Tommen Baratheon
 Ramsay Bolton
 Roose Bolton
 Bronn
 Sandor Clegane
 Khal Drogo
 Tormund Giantsbane
 Theon Greyjoy
 Cersei Lannister
 Jaime Lannister
 Tyrion Lannister
 Tywin Lannister
 Oberyn Martell
 Melisandre
 Jorah Mormont
 Daario Naharis
 Davos Seaworth
 Jon Snow
 Arya Stark
 Bran Stark
 Catelyn Stark
 Ned Stark
 Robb Stark
 Sansa Stark
 Daenerys Targaryen
 Viserys Targaryen
 Samwell Tarly
 Brienne of Tarth
 Margaery Tyrell
 Varys
 Ygritte

Noble families 

 House Stark
 House Lannister
 House Arryn
 House Baratheon
 House Bolton
 House Greyjoy
 House Martell
 House Targaryen
 House Tarly
 House Tully
 House Tyrell

Beings of The Known World 
 Children of the Forest
 Direwolves
 Dragons
 White Walkers
 Night King
 Wights

Languages of The Known World 

Languages of A Song of Ice and Fire
 Dothraki
 Valyrian

Themes in A Song of Ice and Fire 

 Iron Throne
 White Walker

A Song of Ice and Fire fandom 

 A Song of Ice and Fire fandom

See also 

 Sexposition
 Outline of fantasy
 Outline of Narnia
 Outline of Middle Earth

References

External links 

 George R. R. Martin's Official Website
 So Spake Martin, Collection of statements, correspondences and interviews by George R. R. Martin.
 
 
 

A Song of Ice and Fire
A Song of Ice and Fire
Song of Ice and Fire, A